The 1977–78 New York Knicks season was the 32nd season for the team in the National Basketball Association (NBA). The Knicks finished the regular season in second place in the Atlantic Division with a 43–39 win–loss record and qualified for the NBA Playoffs. In the first round of the 1978 Playoffs, New York defeated the Cleveland Cavaliers, 2–0, to advance to the Eastern Conference Semifinals. There, the Knicks lost to the Philadelphia 76ers in a four-game sweep.

Draft picks

Note: This is not an extensive list; it only covers the first and second rounds, and any other players picked by the franchise that played at least one game in the league.

Roster

Regular season

Season standings

z – clinched division title
y – clinched division title
x – clinched playoff spot

Record vs. opponents

Playoffs

|- align="center" bgcolor="#ccffcc"
| 1
| April 12
| @ Cleveland
| W 132–114
| Bob McAdoo (41)
| Spencer Haywood (8)
| Ray Williams (6)
| Richfield Coliseum19,739
| 1–0
|- align="center" bgcolor="#ccffcc"
| 2
| April 14
| Cleveland
| W 109–107
| McAdoo, Haywood (27)
| Bob McAdoo (12)
| Ray Williams (10)
| Madison Square Garden18,965
| 2–0
|-

|- align="center" bgcolor="#ffcccc"
| 1
| April 24
| @ Philadelphia
| L 90–130
| Ray Williams (24)
| Bob McAdoo (13)
| Bob McAdoo (6)
| Spectrum13,011
| 0–1
|- align="center" bgcolor="#ffcccc"
| 2
| April 27
| @ Philadelphia
| L 100–119
| Ray Williams (24)
| three players tied (6)
| Bob McAdoo (6)
| Spectrum15,853
| 0–2
|- align="center" bgcolor="#ffcccc"
| 3
| April 30
| Philadelphia
| L 126–137
| Bob McAdoo (29)
| Lonnie Shelton (14)
| Butch Beard (8)
| Madison Square Garden16,307
| 0–3
|- align="center" bgcolor="#ffcccc"
| 4
| May 1
| Philadelphia
| L 107–112
| Bob McAdoo (24)
| Bob McAdoo (14)
| McAdoo, Williams (4)
| Madison Square Garden15,457
| 0–4
|-

References

New York Knicks seasons
New York
New York Knicks
New York Knicks
1970s in Manhattan
Madison Square Garden